The 1913–14 Colgate Raiders men's basketball team represented Colgate University during the 1913–14 college men's basketball season. The head coach was Walt Hammond, coaching the Raiders in his first season. The team had finished with a final record of 3–12. The team captain was Walt Hammond.

Schedule

|-

References

Colgate Raiders men's basketball seasons
Colgate
Colgate
Colgate